Ebracteola is a genus of flowering plants belonging to the family Aizoaceae.

Its native range is Southern Africa.

Species:

Ebracteola derenbergiana 
Ebracteola fulleri 
Ebracteola montis-moltkei 
Ebracteola wilmaniae

References

Aizoaceae
Aizoaceae genera
Taxa named by Martin Heinrich Gustav Schwantes
Taxa named by Kurt Dinter